Horsemen of the Esophagus by Jason Fagone is a nonfiction book about the sport of competitive eating and the outsized American appetite. Horsemen follows three American "gurgitators" during a year on the pro eating circuit: Ohio housepainter David "Coondog" O'Karma, South Jersey truck driver Bill "El Wingador" Simmons, and Manhattan day-trader Tim "Eater X" Janus.  Horseman makes stops at 27 competitive eating contests around the world, including the Nathan's Famous Hot Dog Eating Contest at Coney Island and includes an interview with Nathan's champion at the time, Takeru Kobayashi.

Further reading 

Horsemen of the Esophagus by Jason Fagone, 
 Book excerpt (subscription only).
 Book review.

Competitive eating